The 1895 Texas Longhorns football team represented the University of Texas at Austin in the 1895 college football season. Led by Frank Crawford in his first only season as head coach, Texas compiled a record of 5–0.

Schedule

References

Texas
Texas Longhorns football seasons
College football undefeated seasons
Texas Longhorns football